Dorr Township is located in McHenry County, Illinois. As of the 2020 census, its population was 21,752 and it contained 8,929 housing units. Dorr Township changed its name from Centre Township on December 28, 1850.

History
Dorr Township is named after Governor Thomas Wilson Dorr of Rhode Island. Governor Dorr helped to modernize voting in America by removing arcane age limitations and fighting for universal white male suffrage. Dorr was arrested and tried for treason before the Rhode Island Supreme Court. In 1844 he was committed to prison with a life sentence of solitary confinement and hard labor. He was released after 12 months but his health never fully recovered.

Geography

Dorr Township is one of seventeen townships in McHenry County. It covers portions of Woodstock, Crystal Lake, Lakewood and Bull Valley. Dorr Township covers 34 1/2 miles of road.

Demographics

References

External links
City-data.com
Illinois State Archives
Dorr Township Official Web Site

Townships in McHenry County, Illinois
Townships in Illinois